Ciomara Otoniela Morais (born 14 March 1984), is an Angola-born Portuguese actress with a Macanese descendant. Morais is best known as the director of the films Querida Preciosa, All Is Well and A Ilha dos Cães.

Personal life
She was born on 14 March 1984 in Benguela, Angola.

Career
In 2005, she made the acting debut with the television serial Morangos com Açúcar. In the serial, her role as 'Salomé' became highly popular and she received many roles in the upcoming years in television. Some of them include, role 'Leonor' in Diário de Sofia, role 'Masara' in Equador and then in Makamba Hotel. Meanwhile, she moved to theater plays with the debut play A Balada da Margem Sul directed by Hélder Costa.

She made her maiden cinema role in 2009 film The Abused with a minor role. Her first lead role in cinema came through critically acclaimed 2011 blockbuster All Is Well with the role 'Leonor'. She won the award for Best Actress at the Festival du Cinéma Africain de Khouribga (FCAK), Morocco and The Carthage Film Festival, Tunisia in 2012 for her role in the feature film All Is Well. In the same year, the film won the award for the Best Portuguese Feature Film at IndieLisboa International Independent Film Festival.

In 2012, she made her directorial debut and writing with the short film Encontro com o Criador. Meanwhile, she also voiced the animation film 'Nayola'.

Filmography

References

External links
 
 Ciomara Morais: Actrice

Living people
Portuguese film directors
Portuguese women film directors
Portuguese film producers
Portuguese women film producers
Angolan people of Portuguese descent
Angolan film directors
1984 births
People from Benguela